Claudia Kohde-Kilsch and Helena Suková were the defending champions but lost in the final 6–2, 4–6, 6–4 against Isabelle Demongeot and Nathalie Tauziat.

Seeds
Champion seeds are indicated in bold text while text in italics indicates the round in which those seeds were eliminated. The top four seeded teams received byes into the second round.

Draw

Final

Top half

Bottom half

References
 1988 WTA German Open Doubles Draw

WTA German Open
1988 WTA Tour